Team Eakie is a Thai auto racing team based in Bangkok, Thailand. The team has raced in the TCR International Series, since 2016. Having previously raced in the Thailand Super Series amongst others.

Thailand Super Series
The team made their debut in the Thailand Super Series in 2006. The team has had much success in the series and in other Thai racing series', amongst them the Thai Endurance Series. They don't race in the Thailand Super Series today, but has had several races wins and podium in the years they raced there.

TCR International Series

Honda Civic TCR (2016–)
Returning to racing the team entered the 2016 TCR International Series with Euroformula regular Kantadhee Kusiri driving a Honda Civic TCR.

References

External links
 

Thai auto racing teams
TCR International Series teams
Auto racing teams established in 2006